was a JR East railway station located in Rikuzentakata, Iwate Prefecture, Japan. The station, as well as most of the structures in the surrounding area, was destroyed by the 2011 Tōhoku earthquake and tsunami and has now been replaced by a provisional bus rapid transit line.

Lines
Wakinosawa Station was served by the Ōfunato Line, and is located 88.3 rail kilometers from the terminus of the line at Ichinoseki Station.

Station layout
Wakinosawa Station had a single side platform, serving traffic in both directions. The station was unattended.

History
Wakinosawa Station opened on 15 December 1933. On 23 May 1960, a tsunami caused by the Great Chilean earthquake submerged both this station and neighbouring Otomo Station, making the line temporarily impassable until the water is removed. The station was absorbed into the JR East network upon the privatization of the Japan National Railways (JNR) on April 1, 1987. The station was one of six stations on the Ōfunato Line destroyed by the 11 March 2011 Tōhoku earthquake and tsunami. Services have now been replaced by a BRT.

Surrounding area
Fumon-in temple

See also
 List of railway stations in Japan

External links

  

Railway stations in Iwate Prefecture
Ōfunato Line
Railway stations in Japan opened in 1933
Railway stations closed in 2011
Rikuzentakata, Iwate
Stations of East Japan Railway Company